"In Between Days" (sometimes listed as "Inbetween Days" or "In-Between Days") is a song by the English rock band The Cure, released in July 1985 as the first single from the band's sixth album The Head on the Door.

The song was an international success. In the UK, it was the band's ninth chart single and their fourth consecutive Top 20 hit; while in the US it was their first single to reach the Billboard Hot 100, where it peaked at number 99. It was a Top 20 hit in Australia and New Zealand and also charted in several European countries, increasing the popularity of the band.

Music video 

The video was filmed on 18 June 1985 at Fulham Studios, London and created by Tim Pope. The video depicts the band playing, enhanced by 360-degree shots and drawn-in, colourful socks. Robert Smith had a camera, held by cables, which he could push away and hold at will; as did Porl Thompson, fixed on his guitar.

Robert Smith talked about this video being the most dangerous The Cure had made to date of publication. The first time the hanging camera was setup in a shopping basket on a rope. A misjudgement with the camera weight was made and the camera just missed hitting Smith in the head by one inch as it swung. Smith then refused to be in the video for the next hour of filming due to the near miss. A stand-in had to complete the test shots and Smith carried on with the filming after he could see that the camera would not be able to cause a serious accident. But Smith said he was happy with the video, and it complemented the song well.

Some of the guitars used in the video had cameras bolted onto them. Smith made sure that only false guitars were used for these shots as he didn't want real guitars to be damaged by the bolts. One of the false guitars had a different coloured strap to the real guitar and this was noticed as a continuity error by Smith the first time he watched the finished video.

Smith is not sure why the coloured socks were added to the video. He asked the video creator, but he had also forgotten why he had added the socks. But the overall idea was to make the video look like The Beatles, Help film by making the colouring of the video blue and white with the band having fun.

Track listing
UK 7" single
 "In Between Days"
 "The Exploding Boy"

UK 12" single
 "In Between Days"
 "The Exploding Boy"
 "A Few Hours After This"

U.S. 7" single
 "In Between Days"
 "Stop Dead"

U.S./Canadian 12" single
 "In Between Days"
 "In Between Days" (Extended version)
 "Stop Dead"

UK CD
 "In Between Days" (2:55)
 "The Exploding Boy" (2:52)
 "A Few Hours After This" (2:25)
 "Six Different Ways (Live)" (3:24)
 "Push (Live)" (4:33)
 "In Between Days" (2:55) (video)

Personnel 

Robert Smith – vocals, guitar, six-string bass
Porl Thompson – keyboards
Simon Gallup – bass
Boris Williams – drums
Lol Tolhurst – keyboards

Charts

Certifications

Cover versions

Studio versions

Other versions
A live version of the song was released on The Rifles' single "She's Got Standards".
The song was covered by Face to Face and is featured in the film Not Another Teen Movie.
 The song was covered by Superchunk as part of the first AV Undercover Series by The A.V. Club.
 The song was covered by Paramore during an acoustic set on Sirius XM Radio in 2013.
 The song was covered by Manic Street Preachers, who performed it at various festivals and at their show at Shepherd's Bush Empire to mark Absolute Radio's tenth anniversary.
 The song was covered by Ben Folds on his 2003 EP Speed Graphic.
 The song was covered by LUAMEL, a South Korean boy band, for the Apple TV+ produced television series, Pachinko, at the end of Episode 4.

References

External links
 

1985 songs
1985 singles
The Cure songs
Songs written by Robert Smith (musician)
Song recordings produced by David M. Allen
Music videos directed by Tim Pope
Fiction Records singles
Jangle pop songs